The 1987 Grote Prijs Jef Scherens was the 23rd edition of the Grote Prijs Jef Scherens cycle race and was held on 20 September 1987. The race started and finished in Leuven. The race was won by Ronny Van Holen.

General classification

References

1987
1987 in road cycling
1987 in Belgian sport